Craig John McDermott (born 14 April 1965) is a former Australian cricketer. Between 1984 and 1996 he played 71 Tests for Australia, taking 291 wickets. Following the end of his playing career, he was the bowling coach for the Australian team for two spells between 2011 and 2016.

International career

McDermott was the spearhead of the Australian attack in the late 1980s and early 1990s. He was powerfully built at 191 cm tall. He started his career with Queensland in 1983–84 and made his Test match debut for Australia in 1984–85 whilst still 19 v West Indies (his youth engendering his nickname "Billy" – from Billy the Kid). In his first Ashes tour of 1985, he took 30 wickets. But he was over-bowled and was burnt out. He had an excellent World Cup in 1987, helping Australia win the trophy. He took 18 wickets in the tournament, including 5/44 in the semi-final win over Pakistan.

McDermott was a rhythm bowler, and when this was right, he would have an aggressive approach to the wicket and an excellent sideways-on action, giving him sharp pace and outswing. He always saved his best for England, taking 32 wickets in the last full series that he was able to play before injuries took over. Injuries seemed to hit him at wrong times, and he missed the history-making West Indies tour of 1995, and most of the 1996 World Cup. He also missed most of the 1993 Ashes tour when Shane Warne and Merv Hughes shared the spoils in his absence. His best bowling analysis in Tests is 8/97 against England in 1991. He ended with 291 wickets from 70 Tests and 203 one-day wickets with the best analysis being the 5/44.

In batting, even though McDermott's average was that of a tail-ender, he could still hit the ball with power and could stand his ground against fast bowling. In fact, two of the closest Tests that Australia lost, McDermott played a key role – In 1993, Australia lost the pivotal closest match in Test history by 1 run to West Indies when McDermott, on 18 and batting with stout resistance, was given out controversially when attempting to play a bouncer from Courtney Walsh. In 1994, he was on 29 not out in the Test against South Africa that Australia lost by 5 runs in chasing 117.

Five-wicket hauls

In cricket, a five-wicket haul (also known as a "five–for" or "fifer") refers to a bowler taking five or more wickets in a single innings. This is regarded as a notable achievement, and as of August 2015 only 43 bowlers have taken 15 or more five-wicket hauls at the international level.  Craig John McDermott is a former Australian cricketer who, according to the sports journalist Greg Baum, was "Australia's premier strike bowler in the early 1990s".  A right-arm fast bowler, he played 71 Test matches and 138 ODIs in his career, taking 291 and 203 wickets respectively.  He took fourteen five-wicket hauls in Test cricket, including two in a single ten-wicket match, and one in the ODI format.

McDermott made his Test match debut for Australia against the West Indies at the Melbourne Cricket Ground in December 1984, with Richie Richardson being his first Test victim.  His first Test five-wicket haul came at Lord's in the second Test of the 1985 Ashes series in June of that year, taking 6 wickets for 70 runs in a 4-wicket victory for Australia. McDermott's best bowling analysis in Test cricket is 8 for 97 against England in the fifth Test of the 1990–91 Ashes series.  He was most successful against England, taking eight of his fourteen five-wicket hauls against them, including four during the 1994–95 Ashes in which he was named player of the series.

McDermott's ODI debut came against the West Indies at the Melbourne Cricket Ground in January 1985.  He did not bat and although he took the wicket of Viv Richards, Australia lost the game by seven wickets. McDermott played 138 ODIs, and took a solitary five-wicket haul against Pakistan in November 1987, in the Cricket World Cup semi-final. His figures of 5 for 44, and an Australian victory by 18 runs, saw him awarded man of the match as Australia progressed to the final.

Coaching career
On 12 May 2011, it was announced that McDermott had been appointed the new bowling coach for the Australian cricket team replacing Troy Cooley. On 11 May 2012, McDermott announced his resignation as Australia's bowling coach, citing the heavy touring schedule as the reason. Craig McDermott has been appointed as the new bowling coach and consultant for Ireland cricket team. In November 2012, he announced that he would be opening a fast-bowling clinic.

McDermott returned to a coaching role with the Australian cricket team on a two-year contract in May 2014.

Personal life
McDermott's sons, Alister McDermott and Ben McDermott are cricketers, playing for Queensland and Tasmania respectively.

References

External links

 
 Gold Coast Sporting Hall of Fame Craig McDermott

1965 births
Australian cricketers
Australia Test cricketers
Australia One Day International cricketers
Australian cricket coaches
Cricketers at the 1987 Cricket World Cup
Cricketers at the 1992 Cricket World Cup
Cricketers at the 1996 Cricket World Cup
Cricketers from Queensland
Coaches of the Australia national cricket team
Living people
Sportspeople from Ipswich, Queensland
Queensland cricketers
Wisden Cricketers of the Year